Lidiia Alekseevna Alekseeva, née Devel (1909–1989) was a Russian émigré poet and writer of short stories. She was among the group of Russians who were forced to emigrate from the country after the rise of Bolshevism. Her writing reflects this hardship but also contains hints of optimism and beauty. Alekseeva was also a teacher and book reviewer.

Biography 
Alekseeva was born in Dvinsk, Russia in 1909 to a small military family. Her father, Aleksei Viktorovich, was a Russian officer. Her ancestry can be traced back to French émigré from the Napoleonic era. Whilst living in the Crimea as a child, Alekseeva began writing poetry at the age of 7. The arrival of Bolshevism in 1917 forced Alekseeva and her family to emigrate from Russia in 1920. She first settled in Belgrade, Yugoslavia. Whilst here, she attended the Russian gimnazium and later the Faculty of Philosophy of the University of Belgrade, graduating with a specialism in Slavistics. After graduating, Alekseeva taught Serbian language and literature in Russian high school. She lived in Yugoslavia until the early 1940s, then moved to Austria, and finally moved to the United States in 1949. Her husband Ivannikov, a prose writer, remained in Belgrade and died there in September 1986. Whilst in the United States, Alekseeva worked in a factory and in the Slavonic Division of the New York Public Library until she retired in 1978.

Writing 
Alekseeva began publishing poetry in the 1930s when she was in her early 20s. Her writing was first published under her maiden name, but she later used the pseudonym Alekseeva. Her first publications appeared in prestigious émigré journals such as Grani, Vozrozhdenie, Novyi Zhurnal, Mosty, and Sovremennik. Several collections of her poetry were published between 1954 and 1980. 

Alekseeva was a lyric poet who utilised extended metaphor. She wrote in a traditional fashion, not needing to turn to experimental techniques to enhance the emotionalism of her poetry. She wrote on themes of loneliness, human cruelty and destructiveness, but also acceptance and resignation. She wrote about her childhood memories of the Crimea and the countries where exile led her. Whilst her works often depicted despair, there are glimmers of optimism in her descriptions of the beauty of nature. Her first volume of poetry, Lesnoe solntse (1954), explores the theme of nature and life in spite of suffering. Alongside poetry, Alekseeva also published lyrical prose miniatures. Her short stories were published in periodicals and the anthology Humor and Satire of Post-Revolutionary Russia (1983).

Alekseeva was also a translator, translating the works of Croatian writer Ivan Gundulić into Russian, and a book reviewer. She was related to fellow poet Anna Akhmatova, who was an admirer of Alekseeva's writing.

Selected works

Poetry volumes 

 Lesnoe solntse (1954, Forest Sun)
 V puti (1959, On the Road)
 Prozrachny sled (1964, The Transparent Vestige)
 Vremya razluk (1971, The Time of Partings)

Translations 

 Slezy bludnogo syna (1965, epic verse by Ivan Gundulic translated from Croatian into Russian)

Book reviews 

 Sinii mir by Nonna Belavina, Stikhi by Oleg Il'inskii, Uzelok by A. Vasil'kovskaia – reviewed in Novyi zhurnal

References 

1909 births
1989 deaths
White Russian emigrants to Yugoslavia
University of Belgrade Faculty of Philosophy alumni
Writers from Daugavpils
Yugoslav emigrants to the United States